The first season of Paixão (Living Passion) began airing on SIC on 18 September 2017 and ended on 3 March 2018.

Plot 

When he is arrested for a crime he did not commit, Miguel will fight to seek justice and recover the love of his life.
Miguel and Luísa, in love since their teens, were planning to get married and fulfill all the dreams they had together. However, everything changes radically during a vacation in South Africa, when Luisa's father dies. Zé, Miguel's best friend, an ambitious man who is also in love with Luisa, hides from everyone that he was the murderer and accuses Miguel of the crime. 
Sentenced to a term of ten years for murder, Miguel is prevented from returning to Portugal and is never again to see the woman he loves.
When he returns to the Algarve after completing his sentence, Miguel finds Luísa married to Zé and mother of Catarina. He discovers the child is his daughter and decides to stay in Portugal to fight for the girl, ready to recover the ten years they missed with each other and becomes a father to her.
While attempting to rebuild himself and remove the stigma of having been the murderer of his ex-father-in-law, Miguel discovers that his autopsy was forged and that the cause of death was not the same for which he was convicted. Miguel determines to go on search to discover who the true assassin was, during which he feels like he reaches a dead end, again and again.
Luisa and Miguel, now on opposite sides, fight against the love that, despite all that's happened, they still feel for each other. Another restraint to this Living Passion is also Zé, willing to do everything to stay with Luisa and Catarina, destroying Miguel.

A fight to regain an old passion and build a new one.

Cast

Júnior Cast

Especial Guest

References 

Portuguese telenovelas
Sociedade Independente de Comunicação original programming